Top Scan is an amusement ride made by Mondial.

Design and operation
The ride has six free-rotating gondolas each with five seats and the standard Mondial Triple-Lock Harnesses, including the belt. As the ride begins, the main support rises upwards slightly so it is not at ground level and cannot cause any risks during the ride, then the ride spins backwards and occasionally forwards then the main arm starts spinning with the gondolas freely tilting upside-down. Top Scan is available as a portable or park model.

Incidents
In the summer of 2005, a woman was killed after being thrown from the ride at Adventureland (New York) when her harness gave way.
In 2010, two women were stranded on the Space Roller at Miami-Dade County Fair and had to be rescued by a cherry picker when the machine stopped in the middle of a ride.

Installations

There are several Mondial Top Scan locations throughout the world, including

References

Amusement rides